The Fourth Estate is a jargon term for the portions of the United States Department of Defense that are not the  military Services or  Intelligence Community agencies including:
 the Defense Acquisition University
 the Defense Contract Audit Agency (DCAA)
 the Defense Contract Management Agency (DCMA)
 the Defense Finance and Accounting Service (DFAS)
 the Defense Health Agency (DHA)
 the Defense Human Resources Activity
 the Defense Information Systems Agency (DISA)
 the Defense Legal Services Agency
 the Defense Logistics Agency (DLA)
 the Defense Media Activity (DMA)
 the Defense Technology Security Administration
 the Missile Defense Agency (MDA)
 the Defense Advanced Research Project Agency (DARPA)
 the Defense Threat Reduction Agency (DTRA)
 the Office of Economic Adjustment.

Fourth Estate entities are all organizational entities in DoD that are not in the military departments, IC agencies, or combatant commands. These include the defense agencies and DoD field activities.  

Together they consumed 18% of the Department of Defense budget in 2018.

Footnotes

References

United States Department of Defense